The Further Adventures of Doctor Syn is the fourth in the series of Doctor Syn novels by Russell Thorndike. It is a highly episodic series of adventures as Syn, in his guise as the Scarecrow outwits the king's agents and keeps his band of Dymchurch smugglers out of prison. The novel inspired the William Buchanan novel Christopher Syn, upon which the Disney film The Scarecrow of Romney Marsh is based, hence the similarities between the plots.

Further Adventures of Doctor Syn was published in 1936. It follows the events of Doctor Syn Returns and is followed by Courageous Exploits of Doctor Syn.

1936 British novels
British historical novels
Novels set in Kent
Novels by Russell Thorndike
Rich & Cowan books